Trotwood-Madison High School is part of Trotwood-Madison City School District located in Trotwood, Ohio. The school mascot is the Ram.

Ohio High School Athletic Association State Championships 

Boys Basketball – 2019
Boys Football – 2011, 2017, 2019
Girls, Track and Field – 1983, 1984, 1995

Notable alumni 

Bam Bradley, professional football player, Baltimore Ravens
Maurice Douglass, former head football coach and former NFL player
Nicholas Grigsby, former NFL football player
John Dorian, medical doctor and podcaster
LaVonna Martin, Olympic silver medalist and Pan-American gold medalist
Don Martindale, defensive coordination, Baltimore Ravens
Roy Roundtree. college football wide receiver
Chris Wright, professional basketball player

References

External links 
Trotwood-Madison Website

High schools in Montgomery County, Ohio
Public high schools in Ohio